Louis Skurcenski (January 29, 1943December 22, 1998) was an All-American college basketball player at Westminster College who went on to play for the Phillips 66ers in Bartlesville, Oklahoma. He was drafted in the 5th round of the 1964 NBA Draft by the Philadelphia 76ers.

Lou died of cancer in December 1998 at the age of 55 and his funeral was on December 24, 1998 in Bartlesville, Oklahoma. He received numerous honors, including induction into the Lawrence County Historical Society Hall of Fame (1996).

References

1943 births
1998 deaths
Philadelphia 76ers draft picks
Deaths from cancer in Oklahoma
Phillips 66ers players
American chemists